Aïn Beïda District is a district of Oum El Bouaghi Province, Algeria.

Districts of Oum El Bouaghi Province